Théoule-sur-Mer (Occitan: Teula de Mar or simply Teula), popularly known as Théoule, is a resort village  in the Alpes-Maritimes department in the Provence-Alpes-Côte d'Azur region in Southeastern France. It lies to the east of the Esterel Massif, on the French Riviera. Théoule-sur-Mer is on the border with the Var department, 6 km (3.7 mi) south of Mandelieu-la-Napoule. In 2018, it had a population of 1,350.

Demographics

See also
Communes of the Alpes-Maritimes department

References

Communes of Alpes-Maritimes
Alpes-Maritimes communes articles needing translation from French Wikipedia